Tem Pra Todo Mundo is the fifth album and first Portuguese album by Brazilian heavy metal band Viper, release in 1996. Its pop-oriented alternative rock style was not very well received by many of the band fans.

Track listing
 "Dinheiro [Money]"  — 2:56
 "Crime Na Cidade [Crime in the City]" — 2:51
 "Oito De Abril [April 8]" — 4:09
 "Sábado [Saturday]" — 2:59
 "Not Ready To Get Up" — 3:44
 "Quinze Anos [15 Years]" — 3:56
 "Na Cara Do Gol [In Front of the Goal]" — 2:32
 "The One You Need" — 3:37
 "Lucinha Bordón" — 2:30
 "Alvo [Target]" — 3:10
 "Um Dia [One Day]" — 3:33
 "Mais Do Mesmo [More of the Same]" (Legião Urbana cover) — 2:46
 "Agradecimentos e Zoação [Thanks and Taunts]" — 7:49

Personnel
Pit Passarell - vocal, bass guitar
Yves Passarell - guitars
Felipe Machado - guitars
Renato Graccia - drums

External links
 Viper official site

1996 albums
Viper (band) albums